Pombal may refer to:

People
 Marquess of Pombal, a title
 Sebastião José de Carvalho e Melo, 1st Marquess of Pombal, an 18th-century Portuguese statesman, Master of the Kingdom (1750–1777)

Places

Brazil
 Pombal, Paraíba, a city in the State of Paraíba

Portugal
 Pombal, Portugal, a municipality in the district of Leiria
 Pombal (parish), a civil parish in the municipality of Pombal
 , a civil parish of the municipality of Alfândega da Fé
 , a civil parish of the municipality of Carrazeda de Ansiães